The Conservative Party of British Columbia is a provincial political party in British Columbia, Canada. In the early half of the 20th century, the Conservatives competed with the British Columbia Liberal Party for power in the province. Since the 1950s however, the party has had only a minor presence, not having elected a member of the Legislative Assembly (or MLA) in a general election since 1975. In February 2023, Nechako Lakes MLA John Rustad joined the party, having left the Liberal Party in 2022. The last sitting MLA for the Conservatives had previously been John van Dongen, who briefly crossed the floor to the party in 2012 before leaving to sit as an independent.

Three Conservative leaders have served as premier of British Columbia: Richard McBride, William John Bowser, and Simon Fraser Tolmie. Two Conservatives have served as deputy premier, both during a coalition government in the 1940s: Royal Maitland and Herbert Anscomb. The current party leader is Trevor Bolin.

Early history

Founding and early years 
The Conservative Party of British Columbia, known colloquially as the Tories, were formed in 1900 as the Liberal-Conservative Party. The party selected Charles Wilson as its first provincial leader. Several opposition factions contested the 1900 general election against the non-partisan government, but these were generally loose groups. In 1902, the Conservative Party convention passed a resolution to stand candidates in the next election.

Party government was introduced on June 1, 1903 by Premier Richard McBride, when he announced the formation of an officially Conservative government. McBride believed that the system of non-partisan government that the province had until that point was unstable and inhibiting development. His Conservatives won the 1903 election, the first fought on the party system, earning a two-seat majority in the British Columbia Legislative Assembly over their rivals, the Liberal Party, as well as various Socialist and Labour MLAs. The Conservatives generally implemented policies mirroring the priorities of the national Conservative Party, which at the time favoured government intervention to help develop industry and infrastructure.

The Conservatives under McBride and his successor, William John Bowser, held power for thirteen years until they were defeated by the Liberals in the 1916 election. In November 1926 the Liberal-Conservative Party formally changed its name to the Conservative Party.

Tolmie government and crisis 
The Tories returned to power in the 1928 election under the leadership of Simon Fraser Tolmie, winning 35 of 48 seats in the Legislature. The Tolmie government was unable to deal with the Great Depression, and was wracked by infighting and indecision. The party was in such disarray that, despite being in power, the Conservative provincial association decided not to run any candidates in the 1933 election. Instead each local association was left to act on its own, endorsing some candidates who ran as Independents, some as Independent Conservatives, and so on. Those supporting Premier Tolmie ran under the 'Unionist' label, while others grouped around former premier William John Bowser and ran as part of the 'Non-Partisan Independent Group'. When Bowser died and the elections in Vancouver Centre and Victoria City were postponed, four Non-partisan and two Unionist candidates withdrew.

The Conservative Party rebounded under Frank Porter Patterson to run a near-full slate in the election of 1937, however they were only able to elect 8 MLAS, just one more than the growing Co-operative Commonwealth Federation (CCF) caucus. In the election of 1941, the Conservatives were able to win 12 seats, compared to 21 for the Liberals and 14 for the CCF. Members of the province's business community, who feared the growing strength of the democratic socialist CCF, urged the Liberals and Conservatives to form a wartime coalition government to ensure stability. Then-Conservative leader Royal Maitland agreed, while then-Liberal Premier T.D. Pattullo was opposed; however, Pattullo was forced to resign by his own party in late 1941. John Hart replaced him as Liberal leader and premier on the promise to form a coalition, and did so, making Maitland Deputy Premier and Attorney General shortly thereafter.

Coalition years 
In 1942, the BC Conservatives were rebranded as the "BC Progressive Conservative Party", following the federal party's lead. Maitland and Hart served throughout the remainder of World War II and continued their partnership past, running a joint ticket in the 1945 election, winning a massive majority government together of 37 out of 48 seats. However, Maitland died suddenly in 1946 and was replaced by Herbert Anscomb, who became Deputy Premier and Finance Minister in the coalition government. When Premier Hart retired in 1947, the Conservatives pushed for Anscomb to succeed him as Premier, but the Liberals, who had more members in the coalition caucus, insisted that the role remain with a Liberal. Byron Johnson was appointed Premier a short time later, but the conflict strained relations between the two parties and leaders going forward, and caused internal divisions to open up within the Tories.

The PCs were riven into three factions: one led by Okanagan MLA W.A.C. Bennett, who called for Liberals and Tories to fuse into a single party, a second faction that supported the status-quo, and a third that wanted Anscomb to simply lead the PCs out of the coalition. Meanwhile, the Liberals were beginning to doubt that they needed the fractious Tories to govern. The coalition was re-elected in the 1949 election, winning 39 seats against nine for the CCF opposition, but despite this, growing divisions within the Conservative Party resulted in Anscomb's leadership being challenged at the 1950 party convention. W.A.C. Bennett, who had moved over to the anti-coalition faction, quit the party and crossed the floor to sit as a Social Credit League of British Columbia member, and eventually formed the British Columbia Social Credit Party.

In October 1951, the Liberals decided to dissolve the coalition, with Johnson summarily dismissing his PC ministers, including Anscomb, and continued forward as a minority government. The Conservatives properly refounded their party and went into the 1952 election with the goal of unseating Premier Johnson.

Decline 
Prior to the 1952 election, the coalition government, whose entire reason for being had been to keep the CCF out of power, introduced an instant-runoff voting system. The idea behind the change was an assumption that the business-oriented majority of BC voters would keep the democratic socialist party out of power through their secondary choices, regardless of the newly formed split between former coalition partner.

However, none of the three parties expected the result of the election. The Social Credit League, led by Albertan Ernest George Hansell, won the most seats, while the two former coalition partners fell far behind. The PCs won only 4 seats total, not including Anscomb's Oak Bay constituency. Two months later, former Tory W.A.C. Bennett would take control of the SoCreds, dropping the party's social credit monetary reform policy in favour of traditional and populist conservative platforms.

It was clear to those who wanted to keep the CCF out of power that only the SoCreds would be able to accomplish that task, and so business-oriented voters left the old parties behind. Having a majority government following 1953, the Social Credit government changed the electoral system back to first past the post in order to cement its base. Social Credit became, in effect, the new centre-right coalition party, and both the Liberals and the Tories became marginalised.

Wilderness years 
Between the 1956 and 1972 elections, the Tories won no seats to the Legislature, and slowly the party began to dwindle downward. Deane Finlayson served as leader from 1952 until 1961, eventually handing the reigns to federal Member of Parliament Davie Fulton. Fulton led the party to a brief surge of relevance in the 1963 election, winning 11% support, but no seats, with even Fulton falling far behind his SoCred opponent in the Kamloops constituency. Fulton left soon after, returning to federal politics while the BC Tories collapsed into ruin.

The Party ran only 3 candidates in 1966, and just one, then-party leader John de Wolf in 1969. It was not until 1971, following de Wolf's ouster as leader by Derrill Thomas Warren, that some hope returned.

In 1971, former SoCred MLA Scott Wallace, who represented Oak Bay, crossed the floor to join the PCs, becoming its first MLA in 15 years. The attention translated into nearly 13% of the vote in the 1972 election and two seats – Wallace's and Hugh Curtis in Saanich and the Islands, both in the Victoria area. Warren was unable to win his own seat. The election was won by the CCF's successor party, the New Democrats (or NDP), who took advantage of the split between the SoCreds, Tories, and resurgent Liberals to form a majority government.

This glimpse at relevance did not last long, however. Wallace was elected leader of the party in 1973, but in the same year his caucus mate Curtis left to join the Social Credit caucus, answering a call by new leader Bill Bennett to reunite the 'pro-business' vote. Wallace was able to win his own seat in the 1975 election, but resigned in 1977 and returned to his medical practice shortly after.

During this time, with most of their voters in BC supporting Social Credit, the federal Progressive Conservative Party kept its distance in order to avoid alienating Social Credit Party supporters. When the federal and provincial election campaigns overlapped in 1979, federal leader Joe Clark made obvious efforts to avoid any contact with Vic Stephens, leader of the provincial PCs.

Wallace's successor in Oak Bay and the party leadership was the last Tory MLA to be elected. Vic Stephens won the seat in a 1978 by-election, but lost in the following year's general election campaign.

The Tories returned to the wilderness in the following years, despite the amazing growth of the federal party during the 1980s. For a brief stint in 1986, former NDP MLA Graham Lea crossed the floor to sit as a PC MLA, but quit politics altogether following the dissolution of the Legislature for the 1986 election.

In 1991, the party changed its name back to the "BC Conservative Party", but was unable to gain traction during the collapse of the SoCred government in the 1991 election and the subsequent re-alignment of BC politics. The party ran only a handful of candidates between 1991 and 2005, as the pro-business voters of the province moved en masse to the BC Liberals.

Recent history

Re-emergence 

In 2005, former BC Reform Party and Christian Heritage Party leader Wilf Hanni was elected leader of the Conservatives. The party was able to field 24 candidates for the 2009 election, its highest number since 1979, and earned 2.1% of the vote province-wide. The re-emergence of the party, despite not coming close to winning any seats, sparked renewed interest in the Conservatives, who began to poll between 5–10% in polls.

New leadership and the 2013 election

At its annual general meeting on September 26, 2009, the party elected a new executive and re-elected Wayne McGrath as president. In 2010, the party formed an advisory committee that included, chairman Randy White, Brian Peckford, Rita Johnston, Jim Hart and John Cummins.

At the end of 2010, the party had the support of 8% of votes according to opinion polls, had approximately 2,000 members, up from 300 in June of that year, and had constituency associations established in 45 of the province's 85 ridings.

Several months after the election of Christy Clark as leader of the Liberal Party, and her subsequent swearing in as Premier, the Conservatives' support rose again at the expense of the Liberals. According to Kevin Falcon, runner-up in the Liberal leadership convention, "a number of my supporters that may have done that and I'm not entirely surprised."

The party held a leadership convention on May 28, 2011, and former Conservative Party of Canada Member of Parliament John Cummins was acclaimed leader. After dropping into single digits after Liberal premier Gordon Campbell's resignation in March 2011, the Conservatives consistently polled above 10 per cent in the last half of 2011, reaching as high as 23 per cent.

On March 26, 2012, Abbotsford South MLA John van Dongen announced that he was leaving the BC Liberals to join the BC Conservatives, providing the party with its first representative in the Legislative Assembly since 1986. In September 2012, John van Dongen switched to independent status after the re-election of John Cummins as leader of the BC Conservative Party.

In the run-up to the 2013 election, Cummins had repeatedly stated his hope to run a full slate of candidates, but the party was only able to field 56 candidates out of a total possible 85. Nevertheless, with high polling and the capability to form a major caucus within the Legislature if elected, Cummins was invited to join the leaders of the Liberals, NDP, and Greens on-stage for the provincial debates.

Despite high hopes, the Conservatives received only 4.76% of the vote and were unable to elect a MLA during the election. The party's strongest result was in Peace River South, where their candidate Kurt Peats came in second place with 27.2% of the vote; all other candidates came in third place or worse. Cummins, previously a federal MP in the area for nearly two decades, was only able to earn 11.9% support in the Langley constituency.

2013–present 
On July 18, 2013, John Cummins resigned from the position of party leader. Dan Brooks was elected the new leader of the party on April 12, 2014, then resigned at the party's Annual General Meeting on February 20, 2016. Brooks was re-elected as leader at a leadership convention held on September 17, 2016. However, on October 28, 2016, the party's executive board removed him from the leadership after ruling that the meeting that approved his candidacy for the leadership convention lacked quorum.

The party was not able to select a new leader before the start of the 2017 election campaign. After nominating 56 candidates in 2013 and earning almost five percent of the vote, the Conservatives entered the campaign for the 2017 provincial election without a leader. It nominated ten candidates, none of whom was elected. Even without a leader, the party still managed an average of more than a thousand votes per riding contested, with no candidate receiving less than two percent of the vote. Leah Catherine McCulloch received the highest vote share of all the Conservative candidates, at 7.55 percent in the riding of Courtenay-Comox.

In September 2017, following the party's AGM, Scott Anderson, a Vernon city councillor, was appointed interim leader by a unanimous vote of the newly elected board. Anderson oversaw the reformation of several defunct riding associations and an increase in membership, and took the party through the Kelowna West and Nanaimo by-elections.

Fort St. John city councillor Trevor Bolin became the party's permanent leader on April 8, 2019.

The party changed its name to the "Conservative Party of British Columbia" prior to the 2020 general election.

On February 16, 2023, John Rustad, MLA for Nechako Lakes, joined the Conservative Party, giving the party representation in the Legislature. Rustad was elected as a Liberal but was removed from party caucus in August 2022, after making comments that climate change is not caused by carbon dioxide emissions. Rustad cited "irreconcilable differences" with Liberal leader Kevin Falcon in explaining his party change.

Bolin announced on March 3, 2023, that he was stepping down as party leader, and a party leadership race would be held in the near future.

Ideology and policies 
The Conservative Party of British Columbia describes itself as conservative, economically liberal, and populist. In a March 2017 interview, the party's communications director John Twigg compared his party's populist and anti-establishment rhetoric with that of the Brexit movement and supporters of Donald Trump's presidency:

The party advocates the growth of British Columbia's fossil fuel and lumber industries. In particular, it opposes the provincial carbon tax and proposes that environmental activists and their supporters be arrested for "illegal activities".

The party also opposes vaccine mandates and passports, identity politics and "gender ideology", and safe injection sites for drug abusers. Regarding the latter, the party proposes that drug abusers be involuntarily committed to drug rehabilitation centers.

Leaders 
 Charles Wilson, March 1900 – 1903
 Richard McBride, 1903 – December 1915
 William John Bowser, December 1915 – August 1924
 Robert Henry Pooley, August 1924 – November 1926 (interim)
 Simon Fraser Tolmie, November 1926 – May 1936
 Frank Porter Patterson, May – July 1936 (interim), July 1936 – 10 February 1938
 Royal Lethington Maitland, September 1938 – 28 March 1946
 Herbert Anscomb, April 1946 – November 1952
 Deane Finlayson, November 1952 – April 1961
 vacant, April 1961 – January 1963
 Davie Fulton, January 1963 – April 1965
 vacant, April 1965 – June 1969
 John Anthony St. Etienne de Wolf, June 1969 – November 1971
 Derril Thomas Warren, November 1971 – December 1973
 George Scott Wallace, December 1973 – October 1977
 Victor Albert Stephens, October 1977 – November 1980
 Brian Westwood, November 1980 – March 1985
 Peter Pollen, March 1985 – August 1986
 vacant, August 1986 – July 1991
 Peter B. Macdonald, July 1991 – March 1997
 David Maurice Mercier, March 1997 – January 2001
 Susan Power, January 2001 – 2003
 Kenneth Edgar King, 2003–2004
 Barry Edward Chilton, 2004 – September 2005
 Wilf Hanni, September 2005 – June 2009
 vacant, June 2009 – May 2011
 John Cummins, May 2011 – July 18, 2013
 vacant, July 18, 2013 – April 12, 2014
 Dan Brooks, April 12, 2014 – February 20, 2016
 vacant, February 20, 2016 – September 17, 2016
 Dan Brooks, September 17, 2016 – October 28, 2016
 vacant, October 28, 2016 – October 4, 2017
 Scott Anderson, October 4, 2017 – April 8, 2019 (interim)
 Trevor Bolin, April 8, 2019 – March 3, 2023, March 3, 2023 – present (interim)

Election results

Notes

See also 

 List of British Columbia political parties
 List of British Columbia premiers
 List of British Columbia general elections

References 

 B.C. Conservative Leader John Cummins resigns

External links 
 

Conservative Party
Campbell River, British Columbia
Conservative parties in Canada
Political parties established in 1903
Conservative Party